Lingtang Hui Ethnic Township (Xiao'erjing: لٍتْا خُوِذُو ﺷِﯿْﺎ) is an ethnic township in Gaoyou, Yangzhou, Jiangsu.  It is the only ethnic township in Jiangsu.  , it has two residential communities and six villages under its administration.

References

Gaoyou
Township-level divisions of Jiangsu